The 1990 Major League Baseball season saw the Cincinnati Reds upset the heavily favored Oakland Athletics in the World Series, for their first title since 1976.

Awards and honors
Baseball Hall of Fame
Joe Morgan
Jim Palmer

Other awards
Outstanding Designated Hitter Award: Dave Parker (MIL)
Roberto Clemente Award (Humanitarian): Dave Stewart (OAK).
Rolaids Relief Man Award: Bobby Thigpen (CHW, American); John Franco (NYM, National).

Player of the Month

Pitcher of the Month

Statistical leaders

McGee won the NL batting title despite being traded to Oakland in late August

Standings

American League

National League

Postseason

Bracket

List of Managers

American League

National League

Home Field Attendance & Payroll

National television coverage

Events
January 9 – Jim Palmer, a three-time American League Cy Young Award winner, and Joe Morgan, a two-time National League MVP, are elected to the Hall of Fame by the Baseball Writers' Association of America in their first year of eligibility.
February – The 1990 Major League Baseball lockout begins. It lasts 32 days, and as a result virtually wipes out all of spring training and also pushes Opening Day back a week to April 9. In addition, the 1990 season has to be extended by three days in order to accommodate the normal 162-game schedule. The same outcome would also occur for the 2021–22 Major League Baseball lockout, which had the 2022 season pushed back a week to April 7 and extended by three days to October 5.
April 14 – CBS begins broadcasting Major League Baseball games.
April 15 - Sunday Night Baseball debuts on ESPN.
April 20 – After retiring the first 26 Oakland Athletics batters, Brian Holman loses a perfect game when Ken Phelps hits a home run in an eventual 6–1 Seattle Mariners win.
May 22 – Andre Dawson of the Chicago Cubs is intentionally walked by Cincinnati Reds' pitching five times. He is the first player to do so in Major League history.
June 6 – The highest-profile managerial firing of 1990 season happens when the New York Yankees fire Bucky Dent before a game against their rivals at Fenway Park, where he hit his famous three-run home run in a one-game playoff game in 1978, making Fenway Park the scene of his greatest moment as a player and worst moment as manager.
June 11 – Nolan Ryan pitches the sixth no-hitter of his career by defeating the Oakland Athletics in Oakland, 5–0.
June 14 – It is announced that the National League will be expanding by two teams for the 1993 season.
June 29 – For the first time in major league history, two no-hitters are thrown on the same day; one in each league. Dave Stewart of the Oakland Athletics pitches a 5–0 no-hitter against his future team, the Toronto Blue Jays, at SkyDome. Hours later, Dodger pitcher Fernando Valenzuela no-hits the St. Louis Cardinals at Dodger Stadium, 6–0.
July 1 – While no longer recognized as such, the New York Yankees' Andy Hawkins pitches a no-hitter at old Comiskey Park.  However, walks and errors lead to four unearned runs as the Chicago White Sox win 4–0.
July 10 – Six American League pitchers combine for a two-hitter and a 2–0 victory over the National League in a rain-delayed All-Star Game at Wrigley Field in Chicago. Texas Rangers second baseman Julio Franco drives in both runs in the seventh inning and is named MVP.
July 11 – The Chicago White Sox host Major League Baseball's first-ever Turn Back the Clock Day game against the Milwaukee Brewers. The White Sox wear slightly modified versions of the uniforms worn in 1917, the year of their most recent World Series at the time. The promotion is aimed at celebrating Comiskey Park's final season. Ballpark ushers and grounds crew wear uniforms from the time period and some use megaphones to announce lineups. Also, ticket prices for the contest were as low as $.50. The White Sox fall 12–9 to the Brewers in 13 innings.
July 12 – Barry Bonds hits his 100th career home run.
July 17 – The Minnesota Twins turn two triple plays in a single game against the Boston Red Sox, yet still lose the game 1–0 on an unearned run. 
July 31 – Nolan Ryan of the Texas Rangers earns his 300th career win, an 11–3 pounding of the Milwaukee Brewers.
August 31 – Ken Griffey and his son Ken Griffey Jr. start for the Seattle Mariners in a game against the Kansas City Royals.  It marks the first time a father and son have ever played in the same Major League game.
September 2 – After coming close on numerous occasions, Dave Stieb of the Toronto Blue Jays hurls his team's first (and so far only) no-hitter, blanking the Cleveland Indians 3–0 at Cleveland Stadium.
September 3 – Reliever Bobby Thigpen sets a major league record with his 47th save in a 4–2 Chicago White Sox victory over the Kansas City Royals. The previous record was set by Dave Righetti of the New York Yankees in 1986.
September 14 – Ken Griffey and Ken Griffey Jr. hit back-to-back home runs for the Seattle Mariners in a 7–5 loss to the California Angels.  Pitcher Kirk McCaskill gives up the historic home runs.
September 15 – Bobby Thigpen of the Chicago White Sox saves his fiftieth game, becoming the first pitcher to reach that mark.  The White Sox defeat the Boston Red Sox 7–5.
September 22 – Andre Dawson of the Chicago Cubs steals his 300th base in an 11–5 loss to the New York Mets, becoming only the second player in major league history with 300 home runs, 300 steals, and 2,000 hits. Willie Mays is the first, though they will later be joined by Barry Bonds.
September 25 – The Oakland Athletics secure their third straight American League West championship with a 5–0 shutout of the Royals in Kansas City. The A's would finish with the best record in baseball at 103–59, the third consecutive year they have done so.
September 29 – While waiting through a rain delay, the Cincinnati Reds watch the Los Angeles Dodgers lose to the San Francisco Giants 4–3, which clinches the National League West Division for the Reds.  The Reds are the first National League team to lead their division wire-to-wire since the inception of the 162-game season in 1962.
September 30 – Harold Reynolds of the Seattle Mariners grounds out; shortstop Scott Fletcher to first baseman Steve Lyons, giving the Chicago White Sox a 2–1 victory in the final game to ever be played at historic Comiskey Park. Bobby Thigpen is on the mound to earn his 57th save, establishing a (since broken) Major League record for saves in a season.
October 3 – On the final day of the regular season, the Boston Red Sox clinch their third American League East title in five years with a 3–1 defeat of the Chicago White Sox. Tom Brunansky seals the win for the Red Sox with a sliding catch in the right field corner with the tying runs on base for the White Sox.
October 20 – The talk of an Oakland Athletics dynasty is proven premature, as the Cincinnati Reds beat Oakland 2–1 to complete one of the most stunning sweeps in World Series history. Series MVP José Rijo (2–0, 0.59 ERA) retires the last 20 batters he faces to give the Reds their first World Championship since 1976. Not joining the celebration at the end is Eric Davis, who ruptures his kidney diving for a ball during the game and is taken to the hospital. It will take Davis several years to fully recover.
December 6 – At Herman Darvick Autograph Auctions in New York City, Shoeless Joe Jackson's signature is sold for $23,100, the most money ever paid for a 19th- or 20th-century signature. Jackson, who could not read or write, copied the signature from one written out by his wife. The signature, which is resold within hours, was cut from a legal document.
December 18 – The National League announces the six finalist cities for the two expansion clubs that will join the league in 1993: Buffalo, Denver, Miami, Orlando, Tampa-St. Petersburg, and Washington, D.C.

References

External links
1990 Major League Baseball season schedule at Baseball Reference

 
Major League Baseball seasons